Ocean Vuong (born , ; October 14, 1988) is a Vietnamese American poet, essayist, and novelist. Vuong is a recipient of the 2014 Ruth Lilly/Sargent Rosenberg fellowship from the Poetry Foundation, a 2016 Whiting Award, and the 2017 T.S. Eliot Prize for his poetry. His debut novel, On Earth We're Briefly Gorgeous, was published in 2019. He received a MacArthur Grant the same year.

Early life 
Vuong was born in Hồ Chí Minh City, Vietnam. His grandmother grew up in the Vietnamese countryside, and his grandfather was a white American Navy soldier, originally from Michigan. His grandparents met during the Vietnam War, married, and had three children, including Vuong's mother. His grandfather had gone back to visit home in the U.S. but was unable to return when Saigon fell to communist forces. His grandmother  separated his mother and aunts in orphanages, concerned for their survival. They fled Vietnam after a police officer came to suspect that his mother was of mixed heritage, leaving her prone to discrimination by the regime's labour policies at the time.

Two-year-old Vuong and his family eventually arrived in a refugee camp in the Philippines before achieving asylum and migrating to the United States, settling in Hartford, Connecticut, alongside six relatives. His father abandoned the family after this. Vuong was reunited with his paternal grandfather later in life. Vuong, who suspects dyslexia runs in his family, was the first in his family to learn to read, at the age of eleven. At 15 years old, Vuong worked on a tobacco farm illegally and would later describe his experiences on the farm in On Earth We’re Briefly Gorgeous.

Education 
Vuong attended Glastonbury High School in Glastonbury, Connecticut, a school known for academic excellence. "I didn’t know how to make use of it," Vuong has stated, noting that his grade point average at one point was 1.7.

While in high school, he told fellow Glastonbury graduate Kat Chow he "understood he had to leave Connecticut." After spending some time at Manchester Community College, Vuong headed to Pace University in New York to study marketing. His time there lasted only a few weeks before he understood it "wasn’t for him."

He then enrolled at Brooklyn College of the City University of New York, where he studied 19th-century English literature under poet and novelist Ben Lerner, and received his B.A. in English. He received his M.F.A. in poetry from New York University.

Career 

Vuong's poems and essays have been published in various journals, including Poetry, The Nation, TriQuarterly, Guernica, The Rumpus, Boston Review, Narrative Magazine, The New Republic, The New Yorker, and The New York Times.

His first chapbook, Burnings (Sibling Rivalry Press), was a 2011 "Over The Rainbow" selection for notable books on non-heterosexuality by the American Library Association. His second chapbook, No (YesYes Books), was released in 2013. His debut full-length collection, Night Sky with Exit Wounds, was released by Copper Canyon Press in 2016. As of April that year, the publisher ran a second printing. His first novel, On Earth We're Briefly Gorgeous, was published by Penguin Press on June 4, 2019. While working on the novel, the biggest issue Vuong had was with grammatical tense, since there are no past participles in Vietnamese. Vuong also regarded the book as a "phantom novel" dedicated to the "phantom readership of the mother, of [his] family," who are illiterate and thus cannot read his book. Voung’s mother was diagnosed with breast cancer three months before the publication of On Earth We’re Briefly Gorgeous. After his mother died in 2019, Voung began writing his second collection of poetry, Time is a Mother, which has been described as a “search for life after the death of his mother."

In August 2020, Vuong was revealed as the seventh writer to contribute to the Future Library project. The project, which compiles original works by writers each year from 2014 to 2114, will remain unread until the collected 100 works are eventually published in 2114. Discussing his contribution to the project, Vuong opined that, "So much of publishing is about seeing your name in the world, but this is the opposite, putting the future ghost of you forward. You and I will have to die in order for us to get these texts. That is a heady thing to write towards, so I will sit with it a while.”

Vuong lives in Northampton, Massachusetts. He is a tenured Professor of Creative Writing at NYU.

Awards and fellowships

Personal life 
Vuong has described himself as being raised by women. During a conversation with a customer, his mother, a manicurist, expressed a desire to go to the beach, and pronounced the word "beach" as "bitch." The customer suggested she use the word "ocean" instead of "beach." After learning the definition of the word "ocean" — the most massive classified body of water, such as the Pacific Ocean, which connects the United States and Vietnam — she renamed her son Ocean.

In November 2021, an excerpt from On Earth We're Briefly Gorgeous was featured in that year's New South Wales Higher School Certificate exams. The paper, the first of two English exams taken by year twelve students in the Australian state, required examinees to read an excerpt from the novel and answer a short question responding to it. On the exam's conclusion, Australian school students bombarded Vuong with confused inquiries via Instagram, to which the author responded in humorous fashion.

Vuong is openly gay, and is a practicing Zen Buddhist.

Bibliography

Novels 
 On Earth We're Briefly Gorgeous (Penguin Press, 2019). OCLC 1052450975

Collections 
 Night Sky with Exit Wounds (Copper Canyon Press, 2016). OCLC 1023185217
 Time Is a Mother (Penguin Press, 2022). OCLC 1313513180

Chapbooks 
 Burnings (Sibling Rivalry Press, 2010). OCLC 1001862161
 No (YesYes Books, 2013). OCLC 878505119

List of poems

See also
 LGBT culture in New York City
 List of LGBT people from New York City
 List of Vietnamese Americans

References

External links
 
 
 

1988 births
Living people
21st-century American poets
21st-century American essayists
American male essayists
American male poets
American writers of Vietnamese descent
American Buddhists
Brooklyn College alumni
American gay writers
LGBT people from New York (state)
American LGBT poets
People from Ho Chi Minh City
The New Yorker people
Vietnamese emigrants to the United States
21st-century American male writers
Vietnamese LGBT poets
Vietnamese LGBT novelists
American LGBT people of Asian descent
LGBT people from Connecticut
T. S. Eliot Prize winners
American poets of Asian descent
21st-century American novelists
American male novelists
American Zen Buddhists
21st-century Buddhists
LGBT Buddhists
Buddhist poets
People from Glastonbury, Connecticut
Writers from Hartford, Connecticut
Gay poets
Gay novelists